Knokke-Heist/Westkapelle Heliport  is a public use airport located in Westkapelle, which is part of the municipality of Knokke-Heist in the province of West Flanders, Belgium.

See also
List of airports in Belgium

References

External links 
 Airport record for Knokke-Heist/Westkapelle Heliport at Landings.com

Airports in West Flanders
Knokke-Heist